Love at First Bite is a 1950 short subject directed by Jules White starring American slapstick comedy team The Three Stooges (Moe Howard, Larry Fine and Shemp Howard). It is the 123rd entry in the series released by Columbia Pictures starring the comedians, who released 190 shorts for the studio between 1934 and 1959.

Plot
The Stooges happily reminisce about the meeting of their respective fiancees whilst in armed forces in Europe. They are an Italian girl, an Austrian girl, and a French girl. To celebrate, the trio drink a toast, consisting of three large mugs containing Old Panther whisky and immediately get pathetically drunk. Moe and Shemp start arguing over their sweetheart, and suggest they end it by fighting "a drool." As ammunition, they spray each other with seltzer bottles. Shemp finally passes out cold, leading Moe and Larry to the conclusion he died. They decided to dispose of Shemp's body by encasing his feet in a round-bottomed tub with cement in order to drop him into the ocean.

While the cement dries, the three doze off. When they come to, all are suffering from hangovers and short memories. Naturally, they cannot figure out how Shemp got into his situation. Realizing they must meet their sweethearts quickly, Moe and Larry load up the tub with sticks of dynamite, which explodes and send the boys flying through the air and onto the docks where their ladies are waiting. However, Shemp is still stuck in the cement, when the French girl comes to embrace him, falling into the water together, getting the other two couples wet from the splash.

Cast

Credited
 Moe Howard as Moe
 Larry Fine as Larry
 Shemp Howard as Shemp
 Harriette Tarler as Parisian waitress
 Christine McIntyre as Katrina
 Yvette Reynard as Fifi
 Marie Monteil as Maria

Uncredited
 Judy Malcolm as female Cafe customer
 Johnny Kascier as Male Cafe customer
 Al Thompson as Sleeping Man in Restaurant
 Slim Gaut as second Male Cafe customer

Production notes
Love at First Bite was filmed August 18–22, 1948, but not released until May 1950. It was partially remade in 1958 as Fifi Blows Her Top, using minimal stock footage.

References

External links 
 
 

1950 films
The Three Stooges films
American black-and-white films
Films directed by Jules White
1950 comedy films
Columbia Pictures short films
American comedy short films
1950s English-language films
1950s American films